Hacıkənd (also, Adzhakend and Adzhikend) is a village in the Goygol Rayon of Azerbaijan.

References 

Populated places in Goygol District